Ludo Coeck (25 September 1955 – 9 October 1985) was a Belgian footballer who played as left winger or central midfielder. His clubs included Berchem Sport, Anderlecht, Inter Milan and Ascoli Calcio.

First capped for the Belgium national team at the age of 19, he went on to play for his country 46 times, scoring four goals, over an international career which lasted a decade.

Coeck was a member of the Belgium squad at España 82, where he played in all five of his country's games and scored with a long-range free-kick against El Salvador, and at Euro 84, where he appeared as a substitute in the defeats by France and Denmark.

On 7 October 1985, while he was on his way back to Antwerp, after signing for R.W.D. Molenbeek and taking part in a TV sports programme in Brussels, Coeck was badly injured when his BMW ploughed into crash barriers on a motorway near the town of Rumst. He died two days later, at the University of Antwerp Clinic in Edegem. He was 30 years old.

Honours

Player
 RSC Anderlecht

 Belgian First Division: 1973–74, 1980–81
 Belgian Cup: 1972–73, 1974–75, 1975–76
 Belgian League Cup: 1973, 1974
 European Cup Winners' Cup: 1975–76 (winners), 1976–77 (runners-up), 1977–78 (winners)
 European Super Cup: 1976, 1978
 UEFA Cup: 1982–83 (winners)
 Amsterdam Tournament: 1976
Tournoi de Paris: 1977
 Jules Pappaert Cup: 1977, 1983
 Belgian Sports Merit Award: 1978

Individual
 Belgian Golden Shoe of the 20th Century (1995): 10th place
DH The Best RSC Anderlecht Team Ever: 2020
Ludo Coeck stadium in Berchem

References

External links

1955 births
1985 deaths
Flemish sportspeople
Belgian footballers
Belgium international footballers
Belgian expatriate footballers
K. Berchem Sport players
R.S.C. Anderlecht players
Inter Milan players
Ascoli Calcio 1898 F.C. players
R.W.D. Molenbeek players
Belgian Pro League players
Serie A players
Expatriate footballers in Italy
1982 FIFA World Cup players
UEFA Euro 1984 players
Road incident deaths in Belgium
People from Berchem
UEFA Cup winning players
Association football midfielders
Footballers from Antwerp